Maceo Demond Baston (born May 29, 1976) is an American former professional basketball player. He played college basketball at the University of Michigan.

High school
Baston attended H. Grady Spruce High School, in Dallas, Texas, where he played  basketball.

College career
After graduating from high school, Baston played college basketball at the University of Michigan. At Michigan, he was part of an all-star recruiting class that included Maurice Taylor, Travis Conlon, Jerod Ward, and Willie Mitchell. He was known for his above-average dunking ability, and tenacious defense. Baston averaged 10.7 points and 6.6 rebounds a game for his Michigan career, which included NCAA Tournament appearances in 1995 and 1998, and the National Invitation Tournament Championship in 1997. Michigan later forfeited its entire 1996–97 season schedule, after Robert Traylor, Maurice Taylor, and Louis Bullock were found to have taken money from a Michigan booster.

Professional career

Early career
Baston was drafted in the second round (58th overall), by the Chicago Bulls, in 1998, but he did not appear in any games for them. He then played for the Quad City Thunder in the CBA from 1998 to 2000, where he was a CBA All-Star in 2000. He was honored as the CBA Defensive Player of the Year, and selected to the All-CBA First Team and All-Defensive Team in 2000. After that, he played in Europe. He played in Italy (SC Montecatini), and in Spain (Joventut Badalona).

Toronto Raptors
After playing in Europe, Baston played with the NBA's Toronto Raptors (February–April 2003).

Maccabi Tel Aviv
After playing with the NBA's Toronto Raptors, Baston moved to the Israeli League club Maccabi Tel Aviv. While with Maccabi, Baston set the EuroLeague Final Four record for blocks in a game, with 6 versus Tau Ceramica, in the 2006 EuroLeague Semifinals.

Indiana Pacers
On July 28, 2006, the NBA's Indiana Pacers signed Baston to a two-year deal, worth $1.8 million, with the second year being a player option. He appeared in 47 games with the team, and averaged 3 points per game.

Return to Raptors
On July 11, 2007, Baston signed an offer sheet to return to the Raptors, worth roughly US$3.8 million, over two years. The Pacers declined to match the offer.

Return to Pacers
The Pacers reacquired Baston on July 9, 2008, in a trade with the Raptors, which also included Jermaine O'Neal and T. J. Ford.

Detroit Pistons
Baston, along with point guard Chucky Atkins, signed non-guaranteed contracts with the Detroit Pistons, on September 28, 2009. The Pistons waived Baston on October 21, 2009.

Budivelnyk Kyiv
Despite having contract conversations with the Serbian club Partizan Belgrade, Baston instead signed with the Ukrainian club Budivelnyk Kyiv, on March 1, 2010. However, he only played in one game with the club, due to physical problems he was having at the time.

Bnei HaSharon
In November 2010, Baston returned to Israel, signing with Bnei HaSharon. However, after playing in seven games with the club, he left the team in January 2011.

NBA career statistics

Regular season 

|-
| align="left" | 2002–03
| align="left" | Toronto
| 16 || 0 || 6.6 || .600 || .000 || .833 || 1.4 || .0 || .3 || .7 || 2.5
|-
| align="left" | 2006–07
| align="left" | Indiana
| 47 || 2 || 8.6 || .645 || .429 || .787 || 1.4 || .3 || .3 || .4 || 2.9
|-
| align="left" | 2007–08
| align="left" | Toronto
| 15 || 2 || 6.9 || .680 || .000 || .700 || 1.7 || .2 || .1 || .3 || 2.7
|-
| align="left" | 2008–09
| align="left" | Indiana
| 27 || 0 || 8.0 || .543 || .000 || .630 || 1.9 || .3 || .2 || .4 || 2.5
|- class="sortbottom"
| style="text-align:center;" colspan="2"| Career
| 105 || 4 || 7.9 || .616 || .375 || .740 || 1.7 || .2 || .2 || .4 || 2.7

Playoffs 

|-
| align="left" | 2008
| align="left" | Toronto
| 1 || 0 || 1.0 || .000 || .000 || .000 || .0 || .0 || 1.0 || .0 || .0
|- class="sortbottom"
| style="text-align:center;" colspan="2"| Career
| 1 || 0 || 1.0 || .000 || .000 || .000 || .0 || .0 || 1.0 || .0 || .0

References

External links

Euroleague.net Profile
Italian League Profile 
Spanish League Profile 
Michigan Wolverines College Bio

1976 births
Living people
American expatriate basketball people in Canada
American expatriate basketball people in Israel
American expatriate basketball people in Italy
American expatriate basketball people in Spain
American expatriate basketball people in Ukraine
American men's basketball players
Basketball players from Dallas
BC Budivelnyk players
Bnei HaSharon players
Chicago Bulls draft picks
Indiana Pacers players
Israeli Basketball Premier League players
Joventut Badalona players
Lega Basket Serie A players
Liga ACB players
Maccabi Tel Aviv B.C. players
Michigan Wolverines men's basketball players
Montecatiniterme Basketball players
Obradoiro CAB players
People from Corsicana, Texas
Power forwards (basketball)
Quad City Thunder players
Toronto Raptors players